Bloodwulf was an American superhero comics title and character created by Rob Liefeld.  The character first appeared in the one-shot Darker Image in March 1993, published by Image Comics.  The character later appeared in a Bloodwulf mini-series from 1995 in four issues, illustrated by Daerick Gross Sr.  He also appeared in a one-shot from 1995 entitled "Bloodwulf Summer Special" where he was pitted against Supreme.

Fictional character biography
Bloodwulf is an alien bounty hunter from the planet Luap'ur where he lives with his multiple wives and brood of children. He craves a life of action, however, and is always ready and willing to leave his quiet, domestic life behind for grand space adventures. His mother, Redwulf, and grandmother, Califia, are also formidable star farers. Bloodwulf's powers include enhanced strength and a personal force field which allows him to breathe in the vacuum of space.

Bloodwulf vs. Lobo
Bloodwulf as created by Liefeld is very similar to the DC Comics character Lobo. In fact, the cover to Bloodwulf #1  depicts Lobo hanging dead in the background, signifying that Bloodwulf has symbolically replaced Lobo as the toughest comic character around. Lobo actually appears in Bloodwulf #2  as a whining, drunken loser whose days of glory are long past because the character was taken out of the hands of his original creators and overexposed by corporate money men. One of Lobo's creators, Keith Giffen, did the plot and art breakdowns for the Bloodwulf "Summer Special".

Rather than being an expansion of the Lobo "idea," however, Bloodwulf was almost a direct copy of the character. The two characters look strikingly similar with only the color scheme differing. Bloodwulf's hair (which is a little taller) and facial tattoo (which is a little bigger) are red whereas Lobo's are black. Bloodwulf also rides a suped-up space motorcycle, as does his predecessor. Even the story plots take a similar tack, both having a science fiction theme while relying heavily on parody and excessive violence. If at all possible, Lobo's humor was a little more subtle and sophisticated, actually poking fun at ultra-violent comics and the fans who enjoyed them. On the other hand, Bloodwulf's humor is more standard fare, poking fun at science fiction standards like Star Wars, Star Trek and Aliens in a more juvenile Mad Magazine fashion. The first issue of the Bloodwulf limited series has a pair of droids approaching the bounty hunter with a hidden message from a captured princess asking him to find a reclusive hermit who is her "only hope." Issue #2  has Bloodwulf visiting the Pleasure Plaza, a space station that looks like a brothelized version of Star Trek Deep Space Nine (including having a Ferengi bar tender). The final villain of the limited series  is a verbose soliloquizer who is an amalgamation of Darth Vader and Sandman writer Neil Gaiman (called "Gaimanwank" in the story).

Notes

References
Bloodwulf on Comicbookdb
Grand Comics Database

American comics
Extreme Studios titles
Characters created by Rob Liefeld